= Boccaccio 2020 =

- Boccaccio 2020
- Directed by: Francisco Saia
- Written by: Francisco Saia
- Produced by: Francisco Saia
- Starring: Francisco Saia; Alberto Trombetta; Paola Giacobbe; Gianlorenzo Neri
- Cinematography: Francisco Saia
- Edited by: Francisco Saia
- Music by: Josh Woodward
- Release date: March 4, 2020 (Italy)
- Running time: 75 minutes
- Country: Italy
- Language: Italian

Boccaccio 2020 is a 2020 Italian film directed by Francisco Saia. Divided into six episodes, the film explores the COVID-19 pandemic in Italy, drawing inspiration from Giovanni Boccaccio's The Decameron.

== Plot ==
In 2020, the world is heavily devastated by the COVID-19 pandemic, with Italy facing a particularly severe situation. The government has issued a decree prohibiting citizens from leaving their homes. In a scenario mirroring the one described by Boccaccio in The Decameron, a group of young people in Florence decide to defy these laws. They gather every evening in a townhouse to take turns telling grotesque stories. The film consists of six such stories.

== Cast ==
- Francisco Saia as Narrator
- Alberto Trombetta as Albi
- Paola Giacobbe as Albi's mother
- Gianlorenzo Neri as Abraham

== Reception ==
The film review aggregator Cinemaitaliano.info described the film as a unique production containing original ideas, addressing significant themes such as bullying, racism, and social exclusion within the contemporary context of the COVID-19 pandemic. It has been noted as one of the early cinematic works to tackle the pandemic's impact in Italy.
